Claigan  is a small coastal  settlement on the north east shore of the sea loch, Loch Dunvegan, on the Waternish peninsula,  in north western Isle of Skye, Scottish Highlands and is in the Scottish council area of Highland.

References

Populated places in the Isle of Skye